Jason Little may refer to:

Jason Little (singer-songwriter), American singer, songwriter
Jason Little (cartoonist) (born 1970), American cartoonist
Jason Little (rugby union) (born 1970), Australian rugby union player